Malhar R. Kendurkar is an observational astrophysics researcher based at Prince George, BC, Canada. His main research focus is on astronomical sky surveys, transient astrophysics and spectroscopy. Kendurkar is well known for searching and studying supernovae including nuclear transients and novae in the Andromeda Galaxy. He is credited with the discoveries of more than 170 transients since 2018. In 2018, to advance the research, he formed an international team of astronomers, the Global Supernovae Search Team (GSNST). The core team members are from Canada, France, India, and the US GSNST is the first sky survey in Canada dedicated to searching for astronomical transients. Kendurkar is also a guest investigator at the Dominion Astrophysical Observatory of the National Research Council of Canada and uses 1.82 m Plaskett Telescope for the sky survey.

Currently, Malhar is the President of Prince George Astronomical Observatory, a past Director for 4 years, a National Director of the Royal Astronomical Society of Canada and a Principal investigator of the Global Supernova Search Team (GSNST). Malhar is also a professor of astronomy at Canadore College.

Kendurkar is featured on several British Columbian and Canadian media outlets discussing his research and promoting astronomy.

References 

Canadian astrophysicists
Living people
Scientists from British Columbia
21st-century Canadian astronomers
Discoverers of supernovae
1994 births
Academic staff of Canadore College